Günther XLI, Count of Schwarzburg-Arnstadt, nicknamed "the Quarrelsome" or , (25 September 1529 in Sondershausen – 23 May 1583 in Antwerp) was the ruling count of Schwarzburg from 1552 to 1571 and then Count of Schwarzburg-Arnstadt until his death.

Life 
Count Günther XLI was the eldest son of Count Günther XL of Schwarzburg (1490-1552), who was nicknamed the Rich or Günther with the fat mouth.  His mother was Countess Elisabeth (d. 14 May 1572), the daughter of Count Philip of Isenburg-Büdingen-Ronneburg.

Günther XL had united all the possessions of Schwarzburg, except the Lordship of Leutenberg.  After he died on 10 November 1552, his four surviving sons ruled jointly at first, with the younger brothers receiving assistance from their mother.  However, in 1571, they divided the county among themselves.

Günther XLI began his military career in Vienna as Seneschal of Emperor Charles V.  In 1553, he joined the imperial army which made an (ultimately unsuccessful) attempt to reconquer Metz.  He then accompanied Philip, the later King Philip II of Spain to London, where Philip would marry Queen Mary I of England.  In 1555, Günther XLI stayed in Brussels, where Charles V gave him .  He then make a visit to Schwarzburg, and then returned to the imperial army, where he served as a colonel.  In 1557, he fought on the victorious side at St. Quentin.

At the turn of 1559/1560, Günther travelled to Dresden on behalf of William the Silent, to take the first steps in the process that led to William marrying Anna, the niece of Elector Augustus of Saxony on 24 August 1561.

Günther XLI married himself on 17 November 1560.  For political reasons, he married William's sister, Catherine of Nassau-Dillenburg.  The marriage remained childless.  The couple lived in Arnstadt for a while, where Günther used his  to build Neideck Castle.  Between 1563 and 1565, Günther and his younger brothers John Günther I and Albert VII fought in the army of King Frederick II of Denmark in the Northern Seven Years' War against Sweden.

In early 1566, Günther XLI returned to the Netherlands.  On 12 March 1566, William the Silent gave a party at the castle of the Counts of Hoogstraten to celebrate his return.  However, this was just a pretext.  William wanted to discuss his strategy towards Margaret of Parma, who was Governor General of the Netherlands, with the other guests, the Counts of Egmont, Horn, Bergen, Meghen and Montigny.

A few weeks later, Günther fought in Hungary in the service of Emperor Maximilian II against the Turks.  During this campaign, Günther acquired his nickname "the Quarrelsome".  He was not respected by the Emperor.  He often quarreled with the Emperor and did not obey orders.  He protested against the Emperor's plan to besiege Esztergom.  Maximilian wrote angrily to Vienna: Count Günther, does nothing but swagger.  He prevents more than he achieves.  His survey stated that I have 1500 horses here, but after I used them once, I see no more than 1000.  I will probably think three times before I use this colonel again.

Nevertheless, the Emperor found new rôles for Günther.  Günther was appointed to the Aulic Council and entrusted with diplomatic duties.  In 1567, he worked in the service of Elector August of Saxony, on behalf of the Emperor.  He participated in the siege of Gotha, which was necessary to arrest the deposed Duke John Frederick II of Saxe-Coburg-Eisenach, who had been banned for failure to deliver Wilhelm von Grumbach at the Emperor's demand.  After Gotha surrendered, Günther arrested John Frederick II and brought him to Vienna.

From 1568 to 1573, Günther advised the Duke of Alba, the Spanish Governor General in the Netherlands.  He then spent some time in Schwarzburg.  In 1582, Emperor Rudolph II sent Günther to the Southern Netherlands again, where he advised Governor General Archduke Matthias as Privy Councillor.

Günther XLI died on 23 May 1583 in Antwerp.  His body was transported from Antwerp to Delft, from there by boat to Emden and from there to Sondershausen, where he was buried.

As Günther XLI was childless, his younger brothers divided the County of Schwarzburg again after his death.  John Günther I (1532–1586) received Arnstadt and Sondershausen and founded the Schwarzburg-Sondershausen line.  Albrecht VII (1537–1605) received Rudolstadt and founded the Schwarzburg-Rudolstadt line.  William I (1534–1597) received Frankenhausen.  Despite marrying twice, William I died childless in 1597 and his share of the County fell to Albrecht VII.

See also 
 County of Schwarzburg
 House of Schwarzburg

References 
 Jens Beger, Eduardo Pedruelo Martín, José Luis Rodríguez de Diego, Joachim Emig and Jochen Lengemann: Günther XLI. Graf von Schwarzburg in Diensten Karls V. und Philipps II. in den Niederlanden (1550) 1551–1559 (1583), published jointly by the Thuringian State Archive in Rudolstadt and the Historical Society for Schwarzburg, Gleichen and Hohenlohe, Weimar, 2003, 
 Carl Eduard Vehse: Die Höfe zu Thüringen, Kiepenheuer, Leipzig, 1994, 
 Klaus Vetter: Wilhelm von Oranien, Akademie-Verlag, Berlin, 1987, 
 Friedrich Apfelstedt: Das Haus Kevernburg-Schwarzburg von seinem Ursprunge bis auf unsere Zeit, Arnstadt, 1890
 Johann Christian August Junghans: Geschichte der schwarzburgischen Regenten, Leipzig, 1821, Online
 Dr. Kamill von Behr: Genealogie der in Europa regierenden Fürstenhäuser, Leipzig, 1870
 

Counts of Schwarzburg
House of Schwarzburg
People from Arnstadt
People from Sondershausen
1529 births
1583 deaths
16th-century German people